Highfield Football Club was a football club based in Waltham Abbey, England.

History
In 1945, Highfield were formed, joining the Enfield Alliance League. In 1963, Highfield joined the London League from the Northern Suburban Intermediate League. In 1971, Highfield joined the Metropolitan–London League, becoming founder members in the process. In 1975, Highfield joined the London Spartan League. In 1981, Highfield joined the FA Vase for the first time. In 1984, Highfield left the London Spartan League and folded following the loss of their Abbey Road ground to housing.

Ground
During the early days of the club, Highfield played at Willoughby Lane in Tottenham. Highfield later moved to the Northmet Sports Ground in Enfield. In the late 1970s, Highfield moved to Abbey Road in Waltham Abbey.

Records
Best FA Vase performance: Second round, 1982–83

References

Sport in the London Borough of Haringey
Sport in the London Borough of Enfield
1945 establishments in England
Association football clubs established in 1945
1984 disestablishments in England
Association football clubs disestablished in 1984
London League (football)
Spartan League
Metropolitan–London League
Greater London League
Defunct football clubs in London
Defunct football clubs in Essex